Diathraustodes fulvofusa is a moth in the family Crambidae. It was described by George Hampson in 1901. It is found in India and China.

References

Acentropinae
Moths described in 1901
Taxa named by George Hampson